This is a list of German chemists.

A 

 Richard Abegg
 Friedrich Accum
 Franz Karl Achard
 Georgius Agricola
 Reinhart Ahlrichs
 Albertus Magnus
 Kurt Alder
 Fritz Aldinger
 Reinhold Aman
 Otto Ambros
 Johann Gerhard Reinhard Andreae
 Andreas von Antropoff
 Momme Andresen
 Leonid Andrussow
 Richard Anschütz
 Rolf Appel
 Fritz Arndt
 Karl Arnold
 Friedrich Auerbach
 Karl von Auwers

B 

 Lambert Heinrich von Babo
 Manfred Baerns
 Adolf von Baeyer
 Eugen Bamberger
 Johann Conrad Barchusen
 Eugen Baumann
 Otto Bayer
 Johann Joachim Becher
 Gerd Becker
 Johan Heinrich Becker
 Karl Heinrich Emil Becker
 Ernst Otto Beckmann
 Walter Behrens
 Gottfried Christoph Beireis
 Johann Benckiser
 Otto Berg
 Friedrich Bergius
 Alfred Bertheim
 Basilius Besler
 Heinrich Biltz
 Wilhelm Biltz
 Otto Saly Binswanger
 August Bischler
 Gustav Bischof
 Siegfried Blechert
 Victor Gustav Bloede
 Carl Blumenreuter
 Hans Bock
 Walter Bock
 Max Bockmühl
 Max Bodenstein
 Guido Bodländer
 Hanns-Peter Boehm
 Johann Böhm
 Horst Böhme
 Wilhelm Boland
 Werner von Bolton
 Karl Friedrich Bonhoeffer
 Hans-Joachim Born
 Carl Bosch
 Rudolf Christian Böttger
 Magnus von Braun
 Michael Braungart
 Holger Braunschweig
 Georg Bredig
 Julius Bredt
 Michael Buback
 Hans Theodor Bucherer
 Eduard Buchner
 Ernst Büchner
 Wilhelm Heinrich Sebastian Bucholz
 Robert Bunsen
 Adolf Butenandt

C 

 Georg Ludwig Carius
 Heinrich Caro
 Nikodem Caro
 Johann Friedrich Cartheuser
 Ernst Boris Chain
 Lorenz S. Cederbaum
 Rainer Ludwig Claisen
 Erich Clar
 Alexander Classen
 Adolf Karl Ludwig Claus
 Carl Friedrich Claus
 Klaus Clusius
 Lorenz Florenz Friedrich von Crell
 Erika Cremer
 Theodor Curtius

D 

 Gerhard Damköhler
 Ludwig Darmstaedter
 Heinrich Debus
 Gero Decher
 Max Delbrück
 Friedrich Wilhelm Hermann Delffs
 Walter Dieckmann
 Otto Diels
 Geerd Diercksen
 Johann Wolfgang Döbereiner
 Manfred Donike
 Johann Georg Noel Dragendorff
 Heinrich Dreser
 Gottfried von Droste
 Adolph Ferdinand Duflos
 Carl Duisberg
 Friedrich Philipp Dulk
 August Dupré

E 

 Gustav Ehrhart
 Felix Ehrlich
 Arthur Eichengrün
 Manfred Eigen
 Alfred Einhorn
 Bernd Eistert
 Karl Elbs
 Alexander Ellinger
 Gustav Embden
 Adolph Emmerling
 Dieter Enders
 Karl Engler
 Otto Linné Erdmann
 Hugo Erdmann
 Charles F. Erhart
 Friedrich Gustav Carl Emil Erlenmeyer
 Emil Erlenmeyer
 Gerhard Ertl
 Arnold Eucken

F 

 Constantin Fahlberg
 Marga Faulstich
 Hermann von Fehling
 Claudia Felser
 Dieter Fenske
 Erhard Fernholz
 Robert Feulgen
 Maximilian Fichtner
 Heino Finkelmann
 Hans Finkelstein
 Ernst Gottfried Fischer
 Ernst Otto Fischer
 Franz Joseph Emil Fischer
 Hans Fischer
 Hermann Emil Fischer
 Karl Fischer
 Nikolaus Wolfgang Fischer
 Wilhelm Rudolph Fittig
 Wilhelm Fleischmann
 Theodor Förster
 Jens Frahm
 Adolph Frank
 Herman Frasch
 Hans Freeman
 Max Fremery
 Friedrich August Frenzel
 Carl Remigius Fresenius
 Karl Freudenberg
 Herbert Freundlich
 Paul Friedländer
 Fritz Walter Paul Friedrichs
 Karl Theophil Fries
 Carl Julius Fritzsche
 August Sigmund Frobenius
 Johann Nepomuk von Fuchs

G 

 Siegmund Gabriel
 Friedrich Gaedcke
 Johann Gasteiger
 Ludwig Gattermann
 Hieronymus David Gaubius
 Jürgen Gauß
 Adolph Ferdinand Gehlen
 Karl-Hermann Geib
 Philipp Lorenz Geiger
 Johann Gottlieb Georgi
 Heinz Gerischer
 Johann Georg Anton Geuther
 Gustav Giemsa
 Bernd Giese
 Friedrich Oskar Giesel
 Ludwig Wilhelm Gilbert
 Johann Rudolf Glauber
 Frank Glorius
 Jürgen Gmehling
 Christian Gmelin
 Leopold Gmelin
 Philipp Friedrich Gmelin
 Karl Christian Traugott Friedemann Goebel
 Oswald Helmuth Göhring
 Hans Goldschmidt
 Theodor Goldschmidt
 Eugen Freiherr von Gorup-Besanez
 Johann Friedrich August Göttling
 Josef Goubeau
 Carl Gräbe
 Michael Grätzel
 Friedrich Albrecht Carl Gren
 Peter Griess
 Rainer Grießhammer
 Aristid von Grosse
 Wilhelm Groth
 Theodor Grotthuss
 Hermann Julius Grüneberg
 Carl Gustav Guckelberger
 Rudolf Günsberg

H 

 Wilhelm Haarmann
 Fritz Haber
 Eugen de Haën
 Carl Hagemann
 Karl Gottfried Hagen
 Otto Hahn
 Georg Erhard Hamberger
 Michael Hanack
 Johann Ludwig Hannemann
 Arthur Rudolf Hantzsch
 Carl Harries
 Hermann Hartmann
 Johannes Hartmann
 Robert Havemann
 Stefan Hecht
 Friedrich Heeren
 Edgar Heilbronner
 Franz Hein
 Wilhelm Heinrich Heintz
 Axel C. Heitmann
 Burckhardt Helferich
 Carl Magnus von Hell
 Stefan Hell
 Hans Hellmann
 Hermann Hellriegel
 Wilhelm Henneberg
 Jürgen Hennig
 Karl Samuel Leberecht Hermann
 Sigismund Friedrich Hermbstädt
 Richard Herz
 Gerhard Herzberg
 Friedrich Heusler
 Evamarie Hey-Hawkins
 Walter Hieber
 Andreas Hierlemann
 Georg Friedrich Hildebrandt
 Albert Hilger
 William Francis Hillebrand
 Franz Hillenkamp
 Günther Hillmann
 Gustavus Detlef Hinrichs
 Oscar Hinsberg
 Felix Hoffmann
 August Wilhelm von Hofmann
 Fritz Hofmann
 Karl Andreas Hofmann
 Franz Hofmeister
 Felix Hoppe-Seyler
 Rudolf Hoppe
 Heinrich Hörlein
 Leopold Horner
 Josef Houben
 Hans Hübner
 Erich Hückel
 Gustav von Hüfner
 Rolf Huisgen
 Hermann Hummel
 Klaus-Dieter Hungenberg
 Heinz Hunsdiecker
 Erich Huzenlaub

I 
 Clara Immerwahr
 Junes Ipaktschi

J 
 Gerhart Jander
 Joachim Jose
 Johann Juncker
 Alexander Just

K 

 Wolfgang Kaim
 Kajetan Georg von Kaiser
 Helmut Kallmeyer
 Walter Kaminsky
 Ellen Kandeler
 Michael Karas
 Olaf Karthaus
 Emanuel Kaspar
 Karl Wilhelm Gottlob Kastner
 Wilhelm Keim
 August Kekulé
 Bernhard Keppler
 Klaus Kern
 Werner Kern
 Thomas M. Klapötke
 Martin Heinrich Klaproth
 Fritz Klatte
 Friedrich Ludwig Knapp
 Friedrich Knauer
 Emil Knoevenagel
 Wilhelm Knop
 Ludwig Knorr
 Julius Arnold Koch
 Christoph Kohl
 Hermann Kolbe
 Anton Köllisch
 Joseph König
 Hermann Franz Moritz Kopp
 Wilhelm Körner
 Oskar Korschelt
 Friedrich Krafft
 Philip Kraft
 Karl-Ludwig Kratz
 Georg Ludwig Engelhard Krebs
 Hans Adolf Krebs
 Heinrich Ludwig Hermann Krekeler
 August Krönig
 Gerhard Krüss
 Jochen Küpper
 Johannes Sibertus Kuffler
 Franz Xaver Kugler
 Hans Kühne

L 

 Conrad Laar
 Albert Ladenburg
 Gerhard Lagaly
 Wilhelm August Lampadius
 Augustin Gottfried Ludwig Lentin
 Johann Gottfried Leonhardi
 Hermann Leuchs
 Rudolf Leuckart
 Carl Leverkus
 Julius Lewkowitsch
 Andreas Libavius
 Carl Theodore Liebermann
 Justus von Liebig
Benjamin List
 Raphael Eduard Liesegang
 Heinrich Limpricht
 Eduard Linnemann
 Edmund Oscar von Lippmann
 Georg Lockemann
 Oscar Loew
 Lotte Loewe
 Wilhelm Lossen
 Carl Jacob Löwig
 Georg Lunge
 Paul Luther
 Hermann Lux

M 

 Heinrich Gustav Magnus
 Joachim Maier
 Christoph Mangold
 Carl Mannich
 Richard Felix Marchand
 Willy Marckwald
 Andreas Sigismund Marggraf
 Ludwig Clamor Marquart
 Dieter Mecke
 Edmund ter Meer
 Fritz ter Meer
 Hans Meerwein
 Uwe Meierhenrich
 Jakob Meisenheimer
 Paul Mendelssohn Bartholdy
 Rudolf Mentzel
 Louis Merck
 Angela Merkel
 John Theodore Merz
 Kurt Heinrich Meyer
 Julius Lothar Meyer
 Viktor Meyer
 Wilhelm Meyerhoffer
 August Michaelis
 Leonor Michaelis
 Maria-Elisabeth Michel-Beyerle
 Wilhelm Michler
 Adolf Miethe
 Alexander Mitscherlich
 Eilhard Mitscherlich
 Alwin Mittasch
 Karl Friedrich Mohr
 Ludwig Mond
 Rainer Moormann
 Johann Moriaen
 Brigitte Mühlenbruch
 Richard Müller
 Johann Mulzer
 Ferdinand Münz

N 

 Frank Neese
 Walther Nernst
 Julius Neßler
 Ernst Anton Nicolai
 Gereon Niedner-Schatteburg
 Albert Niemann
 Rudolf Nietzki
 Ida Noddack
 Walter Noddack
 Wilhelm Normann

O 

 Heribert Offermanns
 Günther Ohloff
 Alfred Oppenheim
 Gottfried Osann
 Heinrich Oster
 Wilhelm Ostwald
 Wolfgang Ostwald

P 

 Hermann Pauly
 Hans von Pechmann
 Otto Perutz
 Kurt Peters
 Norbert Peters
 Frauke Petry
 Max Joseph von Pettenkofer
 Sigrid D. Peyerimhoff
 Christoph Heinrich Pfaff
 Paul Pfeiffer
 Charles Pfizer
 Rainer Philippson
 Oskar Piloty
 Adolf Pinner
 Eugen Piwowarsky
 Karl Friedrich Plattner
 Agnes Pockels
 John Polanyi
 Theodor Poleck
 Klaus Praefcke
 Horst Prinzbach
 Bernhard Proskauer
 Lotte Pusch

R 

 Karl Friedrich August Rammelsberg
 Friedrich Raschig
 Gerhard Raspé
 Rudolf Erich Raspe
 Friedrich Rathgen
 Bernhard Rathke
 Ferdinand Reich
 Carl Reichenbach
 Hans-Ulrich Reissig
 Walter Reppe
 Hieronymous Theodor Richter
 Jeremias Benjamin Richter
 Victor von Richter
 Alfred Rieche
 Nikolaus Riehl
 Ernst Hermann Riesenfeld
 Helmut Ringsdorf
 Otto Roelen
 Werner Rolfinck
 Heinrich Rose
 Kai Rossen
 Valentin Rose the Elder
 Karl Wilhelm Rosenmund
 Germar Rudolf
 Otto Ruff
 Leopold Rügheimer
 Friedlieb Ferdinand Runge

S 

 George Sachs
 Otto Sackur
 Reiner Salzer
 Joachim Sauer
 Karl Schaum
 Carl Wilhelm Scheele
 Carl Scheibler
 Alexander Nicolaus Scherer
 Johann Joseph Scherer
 Friedrich Schickendantz
 Hugo Schiff
 Robert Schiff
 Michael Schmittel
 Paul Schlack
 Wilhelm Schlenk
 Carl Schmidt
 Gerhard Carl Schmidt
 Paul Felix Schmidt
 Oswald Schmiedeberg
 Rudolf Schmitt
 Christian Schneider
 Ferdinand Schneider
 Ulrich Schöllkopf
 Christian Friedrich Schönbein
 Carl Schorlemmer
 Otto Schott
 Carl Schotten
 Bernhard Schrader
 Gerhard Schrader
 Johann Schröder
 Heinrich G. F. Schröder
 Wilhelm Schuler
 Hugo Paul Friedrich Schulz
 Ferdi Schüth
 Helmut Schwarz
 Hans-Adalbert Schweigart
 Franz Wilhelm Schweigger-Seidel
 Johann Schweigger
 Peter Schwerdtfeger
 Dieter Seebach
 Peter Seeberger
 Stefan Seeger
 Ephraim Seehl
 Joachim Seelig
 Walter Seelmann-Eggebert
 Friedrich Wilhelm Semmler
 Daniel Sennert
 Konrad Seppelt
 Friedrich Sertürner
 Karl Seubert
 Adolf Sieverts
 Eduard Simon
 Kornelia Smalla
 Franz Leopold Sonnenschein
 Franz von Soxhlet
 Harald Specht
 Max Speter
 Karl Spiro
 Hertha Sponer
 Hermann Sprengel
 Heinz Staab
 Adolf Stachel
 Georg Städeler
 Georg Ernst Stahl
 Kurt Starke
 Hermann Staudinger
 Magda Staudinger
 Wolfgang Steglich
 Christoph Steinbeck
 Wilhelm Steinkopf
 Hugo Stintzing
 Alfred Stock
 Julius Adolph Stöckhardt
 Friedrich Stohmann
 Hugo Stoltzenberg
 Friedrich Stolz
 Fritz Strassmann
 Adolph Strecker
 Friedrich Stromeyer
 Hildegard Stücklen

T 

 Gustav Heinrich Johann Apollon Tammann
 Stephan Tanneberger
 Hermann von Tappeiner
 Bruno Tesch
 William Theilheimer
 Walter Thiel
 Johannes Thiele
 Peter Adolf Thiessen
 Ferdinand Tiemann
 Werner Tochtermann
 Bernhard Tollens
 Moritz Traube
 Wilhelm Traube
 Alfred E. Treibs
 Julius Tröger
 Johann Trommsdorff
 Hans Tropsch
 Otto Tunmann

U 
 Leo Ubbelohde
 Ivar Karl Ugi
 Fritz Ullmann
 Otto Unverdorben
 Werner Urland

V 
 Tina van de Flierdt
 Victor Villiger
 Anton Vilsmeier
 Augustus Voelcker
 Hermann Wilhelm Vogel
 Brigitte Voit
 Jacob Volhard
 Max Volmer
 Daniel Vorländer
 Julius Vorster

W 

 Günter Wächtershäuser
 Heinrich Wilhelm Ferdinand Wackenroder
 Carl Wagner
 Friedrich Walchner
 Paul Walden
 Otto Wallach
 Hans-Werner Wanzlick
 Carl Warburg
 Rainer Waser
 Peter Wasserscheid
 Georg Wolfgang Wedel
 Johann Adolph Wedel
 Gerd Wedler
 Carl Wehmer
 Christian Ehrenfried Weigel
 Fritz Weigert
 Arthur von Weinberg
 Adolf Ferdinand Weinhold
 Rudolf Friedrich Weinland
 Armin Weiss
 Karl Weltzien
 Carl Friedrich Wenzel
 Gustav Werther
 Conrad Weygand
 Theodor Weyl
 Hermann Weyland
 Peter P. von Weymarn
 Hermann Wichelhaus
 Albert Widmann
 Johann Christian Wiegleb
 Georg Wiegner
 Heinrich Otto Wieland
 Heinrich August Ludwig Wiggers
 Julius Wilbrand
 Ludwig Wilhelmy
 Günther Wilke
 Conrad Willgerodt
 Richard Willstätter
 Adolf Windaus
 Clemens Winkler
 Martin Winter
 Robert Wintgen
 Günter Wirths
 Johannes Wislicenus
 Bernhard Witkop
 Georg Wittig
 Georg Christian Wittstein
 Alfred Wohl
 Friedrich Wöhler
 Ludwig Wolff
 Richard Wolffenstein
 Carl Wurster

Z 

 Helmut Zahn
 Werner Zerweck
 Karl Ziegler
 Theodor Zincke
 Eduard Zintl
 Georg Zundel
 Johann Zwelfer

See also

List of chemists
List of German scientists
List of German inventions and discoveries
Science and technology in Germany

German
 
Chemists